John Meesen (born 20 June 1986) is a former Australian rules football player who played for the Melbourne Football Club and Adelaide Football Club in the Australian Football League (AFL).

Career
Drafted with the 8th selection in the 2004 draft, Meesen had a long wait to play his first senior game for the Adelaide Crows. Playing for Norwood in the South Australian National Football League, Meesen was a leading ruckman in the senior side, but was incapable of surpassing Rhett Biglands, Ben Hudson and Matthew Clarke for a spot in the Crows team. Following Biglands' 2007 season-ending injury in the 2006 preliminary final and Clarke's move to St Kilda, it was thought that Meesen would begin season 2007 as back-up ruckman to Hudson. However an injury-plagued pre-season saw Jonathon Griffin and Ivan Maric move ahead of him in the pecking order.

Meesen finally made his debut in round 20 of 2007 against the Western Bulldogs at AAMI Stadium in the Sunday twilight fixture. He came in at the expense of Griffin. It was thought that he may have made his debut a week earlier in his home town of Geelong against the Cats due to Hudson's club-imposed suspension, but the club decided that having an inexperienced ruckman playing alongside a debut ruckman wouldn't be a suitable situation. In October 2007 Meesen was traded to the Melbourne Football Club for the 37th selection in the 2007 AFL draft. He made his debut for Melbourne in Round 3, 2009.

Meesen was delisted at the end of the 2009 season along with Michael Newton; both were re-drafted as mature age rookies. After failing to play a senior match in 2010 due to injury, Meesen was delisted at season's end. Melbourne subsequently appointed Meesen to the role of part-time development coach.

Recently, Meesen returned to his home grown club, Modewarre, where he took the opportunity to co-coach a young and talented team alongside veteran, Josh Finch. Meesen immediately attained the respect from his teammates and committee and begun a very successful 2018 season in Geelong's Bellarine Football League (BFL). Modewarre begun the season with just one win through the first four matches, however, turned the season around winning 9 of the next 11 games to ultimately gain a spot in the BFL Grand Final against the red hot favourites, Barwon Heads. Meesen was a dominant force in the ruck which reflected in his team's performances and brought Modewarre's first Premiership to the club since entering the BFL competition. Meesen was awarded best on ground for his grand final performance to complete his successful season. Meesen also finished runner up in the BFL League Les Ash Medal vote count however Meesen was reported during a minor incident in the 2018 season.

Meesen joined Collegians Football Club in 2021, initially as a Ruck coach, though he went on to play 8 games in the season as Collegian's primary Ruck option.

References

External links

1986 births
Living people
Adelaide Football Club players
Australian rules footballers from Victoria (Australia)
Geelong Falcons players
Melbourne Football Club players
Norwood Football Club players
Casey Demons players
Tiwi Bombers Football Club players
Sandringham Football Club players